Transinne is a village of Wallonia and a district of the municipality of Libin, located in the province of Luxembourg, Belgium. 

It is home to the Euro Space Centre. There is also a theme park in the village.

Former municipalities of Luxembourg (Belgium)